Woods Tea Company is an American folk music group based in Vermont. They perform a wide variety of songs, including sea shanties, folk songs, Irish drinking songs, and Celtic music. The group is known for its energy, musical talent and dry sense of humor between songs.

History 
Woods Tea Company was started in 1981 in Burlington, Vermont, by Bruce Morgan and Rusty Jacobs. The band got its name from a wooden storage box owned by Jacobs that had "Woods Tea Co." printed on its side. Mike Lussen joined the band several years later.

Morgan left the band in the early 1990s. Howard Wooden officially joined the band in 1992, and Tom MacKenzie a year later. In 2000, MacKenzie left, and was replaced by Chip Chase.

The band became a regular feature at Colgate University, where the students knew the band's material. Between songs, students often shout 'Arrgh!' to poke fun at the group's sea shanties. To honor this, MacKenzie wrote a song called "Aargh!" for the students.

The band suffered several losses in its third decade. On October 6, 2006, Chase died from a massive pulmonary embolism. He had been hit by a pickup truck while riding his motorcycle several weeks earlier. A year later, on August 15, 2007, Jacobs died of a heart attack.  In July 2018, Mike Lussen died after a long illness.

Following the deaths, MacKenzie started touring with the group and eventually rejoined the band full-time. In late 2008, Patti Casey became the band's newest member. In June 2010, Lussen retired from the group. MacKenzie left the band again in fall 2013 and was replaced by Pete Sutherland.

Members 
There are currently three members of Woods Tea Company:
Howard Wooden - vocals, guitar, bass, bodhran
Pete Sutherland - vocals, fiddle, mandolin, guitar, keyboard
Patti Casey - vocals, guitar, penny whistle, flute, bodhran

Former members
Tom MacKenzie - vocals, hammered dulcimer, guitar, banjo, keyboards, ukulele
(D) Mike Lussen - vocals, banjo, guitar, bouzouki, bodhran
Bruce Morgan - vocals, guitar, mandolin, concertina
(D) Chip Chase - vocals, fiddle, guitar, mandolin, banjo, bodhran
(D) Rusty Jacobs - vocals, guitar, tin whistle

Discography

1983 - Where Am I To Go?
 Santy Anno
 Wild Mountain Thyme
 The Road To Boston
 Where Am I To Go?
 Panxty Fanny Poswers
 Blow Ye Winds
 Three Pounds Ten
 The Blarney Pilgrim
 The Irish Question
 Sally In The Garden
 No Mans Land
 Summertime - The Rights Of Man

1995 - Side By Each 
 Irish Rain
 Lazy
 Clam Flats / Oyster River / The Bridge / Mud Walk
 Spotted Pony / Sugar Hill
 She Was
 Wayfaring Stranger
 Roll the Old Chariot / Green Willis
 Home Sweet Home
 April Wood
 Three Fishers
 Petticoat Whalers / Nantucket Sleigh Ride
 Chilly Winds
 The Trip
 Daughters and Sons

1995 - Journey Home 
 Paddy's Green Shamrock Shore
 Boyne Water
 By The Hush
 Roll Highway
 Johnny Jump Up
 Take Your Pay
 Foolish Questions
 Talcahuano Girls
 Jenny-Lynne
 Ghost of Gloucester's Fleet
 Matthew 18:3
 Mist Covered Mountains
 Pull Down Your Vest
 Goin' Away

1999 - The Wood's Tea Co. - Live! 
 Daughters & Sons
 The Wild Rover
 Banks of Newfoundland
 Wee Wee
 Jenny Glenn
 The Scotsman's Kilt
 The Folker
 'Aargh!'
 Here I Am
 Blarney Pilgrim / Morpeth Rant
 Roll the Old Chariots
 The Dutchman
 Foolish Questions
 Alberta Bound
 The Cat Came Back
 Finnegan's Wake
 Somewhere Over the Rainbow
 There Were Roses
 Sandy River Bell / Soldiers Joy

2001 - This Side of the Sea 
 Haul Away Joe
 St. Patrick's Day in America
 The Fireman
 Unst Wedding March
 The High Cost of Living
 This Side of the Sea
 The Morning Comes Early
 Farewell
 The Bullgine
 She Loves the Rain
 Little Birdie
 Ode to New Jersey
 Planxty Fanny Powers
 Bedford Harbor
 Lift & Tow

2003 - Standing Room Only 
 Lonesome Traveller
 The Country Life
 Morning on the Clam Flats / Oyster River
 Girl of My Dreams
 Inspirational Moment
 RH Intro
 Robin Hood (written by first-graders in Burlington, Vermont)
 Olympic Audience Judging
 Lament for Henriette / St. Anne's Reel / Soldier's Joy
 Sweet Appreciation
 18 Again
 Where Am I To Go
 Santuario
 Rock / O'Keef's Slide / Lord of The Dance
 The Schooner I'm Alone
 Don't Pet the Dog
 Give Me Just a Little More Time
 This Land is Your Land
 Speed The Plow / Mason's Apron / Devil's Dream
 Rolling Home

2003 - An Evening With Woods Tea Company (DVD) 
 Was aired on PBS a number of times.

2007 - The Passage 
 The Passage / Whistle Jump
 All The Hard Days Are Gone
 December's Child
 Sink The Cheerio
 My Monday
 Before They Close The Minstrel Show
 The Coal Town Road
 Lovell the Robber
 The Old Dun Cow
 For Rusty
 Reuben James
 Round The Bend
 Gin Ye Marry Me or Birnie Bouzle
 On Board the Saratoga
 God Rest Ye Merry Gentlemen / O'Carolyn Tune
 The Waterfall

2009 - A Lively Evening with The Woods Tea Co. 
This album was released on February 20, 2009, as a DVD and CD combo.

 Where Am I To Go?
 The Old Dun Cow / Star of Munster / Temperance Reel
 The Remember Song
 Down From Canada
 The Wild Rover
 Glencoe Schottische / Lord Of The Dance
 Little Birdie
 Sink The Cheerio
 Ghost Of Pekin Brook
 The High Cost of Living
 Handsome Patrick
 Sandy River Belle / Soldier's Joy
 Old Man
 This Little Light Of Mine
 Rolling Home
 Patti's Dance

2010 - 10 For 10 
This album was released at various times during 2010 for $10, and it has 10 songs on it, hence the name. It is the first CD released without Mike Lussen.

 Star of the County Down
 The Silver Caravan
 Give Me Just a Little More Time
 Gander In the Stubble
 Ste Joseph / Girl With the Blue Dress/Ste Antoine
 Spotted Pony / Sugar Hill
 Into This Night
 Old Woman / Ten Penny Bit
 The Grey Funnel Line
 The Dog's Complaint

References

External links 
Official website

American folk musical groups
Celtic music groups